Maud Watson defeated Blanche Bingley 6–1, 7–5 to win the ladies' singles tennis title at the 1885 Wimbledon Championships.

Draw

Draw

References

External links

Ladies' Singles
Wimbledon Championship by year – Women's singles
Wimbledon Championships - Singles
Wimbledon Championships - Singles